KUCL-LD, virtual and UHF digital channel 26, is a low-powered Hope Channel-affiliated television station licensed to Salt Lake City, Utah, United States. Founded on April 7, 1992, the station is owned by Christian Life Broadcasting. Its signal covers a majority of the Salt Lake portion of the Wasatch Front.

Currently, its transmitter is located next to Wasatch Hills church at 2139 Foothill Boulevard in Salt Lake City. The station began broadcasting a digital signal in late August and early September 2009.

Digital channels
The station's digital signal is multiplexed:

References

External links
 3ABN official site
 

Religious television stations in the United States
Three Angels Broadcasting Network
Low-power television stations in the United States
Television channels and stations established in 1992